The Daventry Express is a local weekly newspaper serving Daventry and the surrounding villages. It is published every Thursday. It has a circulation of 7,500 and is owned by Johnston Press.

Its offices are located in Daventry High Street.

In 1869 the Daventry Express was published on Saturdays by Thomas and John William Barrett. The newspaper was discontinued in 1940, at a time of national paper shortages, but was revived in 1948 under the title Daventry and District Weekly Express, shortened to Daventry Weekly Express in 1966, and again to Daventry Express in 1990.

See also
List of newspapers in the United Kingdom

References

 HoldtheFrontPage.co.uk, 30 April 2007.

External links
Daventry Express

Newspapers published in Northamptonshire
Daventry
Newspapers published by Johnston Press